Viktor Jiráský is Czech sprint canoer and marathon canoeist who competed in the late 1990s. He won a bronze medal at the 1998 ICF Canoe Sprint World Championships in Szeged.

References

Czech male canoeists
Living people
Year of birth missing (living people)
ICF Canoe Sprint World Championships medalists in Canadian